Smoke is the fifth album from Southern rock group Drivin N Cryin. It was released in February 1993 on Island Records.

Track listing 

Notes
 CD includes "Can’t Fall Off the Mountain," a hidden track which begins after 30 seconds of silence following "Turn It Up Or Turn It Off," making track 12's total length 8:09.

References 

Island Records albums
Drivin N Cryin albums
1993 albums